Monir Shahroudy Farmanfarmaian (16 December 1922 – 20 April 2019) was an Iranian artist and a collector of traditional folk art. She is noted for having been one of the most prominent Iranian artists of the contemporary period, and she was the first artist to achieve an artistic practice that weds the geometric patterns and cut-glass mosaic techniques (Āina-kāri) of her Iranian heritage with the rhythms of modern Western geometric abstraction. In 2017, the Monir Museum in Tehran, Iran was opened in her honor.

Early life and education
Shahroudy was born on December 18, 1922, to educated parents in the religious town of Qazvin in north-western Iran. Farmanfarmaian acquired artistic skills early on in childhood, receiving drawing lessons from a tutor and studying postcard depictions of western art. After studying at the University of Tehran at the Faculty of Fine Art in 1944, she then moved to New York City via steamboat, when World War II derailed her plans to study art in Paris. In New York, she studied at Cornell University, at Parsons School of Design, where she majored in fashion illustration, and at the Art Students League of New York.

Career
As a fashion illustrator, she held various freelance jobs, working with magazines such as Glamour before being hired by the Bonwit Teller department store, where she made the acquaintance of a young Andy Warhol. Additionally, she learned more about art through her trips to museums and through her exposure to the 8th Street Club and New York's avant-garde art scene, becoming friends with artists and contemporaries Louise Nevelson, Jackson Pollock, Willem de Kooning, Barnett Newman, and Joan Mitchell.

First return to Iran
In early 1957, Farmanfarmaian moved back to Iran. Inspired by the resident culture, she discovered "a fascination with tribal and folk artistic tradition" of her country's history, which "led her to rethink the past and conceive a new path for her art." In the following years, she would further develop her Persian inspiration by crafting mirror mosaics and abstract monotypes. Meanwhile her work was featured at the Iran Pavilion in the 1958 Venice Biennale, and holding a number of exhibitions in places such as Tehran University (1963), the Iran-America Society (1973), and the Jacques Kaplan/Mario Ravagnan Gallery (1974).

Exile and return to Iran 
In 1979, Farmanfarmaian and her second husband, Abol-Bashar, traveled to New York to visit family. Around the same time, the Islamic Revolution began, and so the Farmanfarmaians found themselves exiled from Iran, an exile that would last for over twenty years. Farmanfarmaian attempted to reconcile her mirror mosaics with the limited resources offered in America, but such lacking materials and comparatively inexperienced workers restricted her work. In the meantime, she placed larger emphasis on other aspects of her art, such as commissions, textile designs, and drawing.

Third return to Iran and death
In 1992, Farmanfarmaian returned to Iran and later, in Tehran in 2004, she reaffirmed her place among Iran's art community, gathering both former and new employees to help create her mosaics.  She continued to live and work in Tehran until her death.

On 20 April 2019 Farmanfarmaian died at her home at the age of 96.

Artwork 
Aside from her mirror work (a technique known as Āina-kāri), Farmanfarmaian is additionally known for her paintings, drawings, textile designs, and monotypes.

Mirror mosaics 
Around the 1970s, Farmanfarmaian visited the Shah Cheragh mosque in Shiraz, Iran. With the shrine's "high-domed hall ... covered in tiny square, triangular, and hexagonal mirrors," similar to many other ancient Iranian mosques, this event acted as a turning point in Farmanfarmaian's artistic journey, leading to her interest in mirror mosaic artwork. In her memoir, Farmanfarmaian described the experience as transformative: "The very space seemed on fire, the lamps blazing in hundreds  of thousands of reflection ... It was a universe unto itself, architecture transformed into performance, all movement and fluid light, all solids fractured and dissolved in brilliance in space, in prayer. I was overwhelmed."Aided by the Iranian craftsman, Hajji Ostad Mohammad Navid, she created a number of mosaics and exhibition pieces by cutting mirrors and glass paintings into a multitude of shapes, which she would later reform into constructions which evoked aspects of Sufism and Islamic culture. Āina-kāri is the traditional art of cutting mirrors into small pieces and slivers, placing them in decorative shapes over plaster. This form of Iranian reverse glass and mirror mosaics is a craft traditionally passed on from father to son. Farmanfarmaian, however, was the first contemporary artist to reinvent the traditional medium in a contemporary way. By striving to mix Iranian influences and the tradition of mirror artwork with artistic practices outside of strictly Iranian culture, "offering a new way of looking at ancient aesthetic elements of this land using tools that are not limited to a particular geography," Farmanfarmaian was able to express a cyclical conception of spirituality, space, and balance in her mosaics.

Personal life 
Farmanfarmaian married Iranian artist Manoucher Yektai in 1950. They divorced in 1953, and in 1957, she returned to Tehran to marry lawyer Abolbashar Farmanfarmaian. In 1991, Abolbashar died of leukemia. She has two daughters, Nima and Zahra. While living in Iran, Farmanfarmaian was also an avid collector. She sought out paintings behind glass, traditional tribal jewelry and potteries, and amassed one of the greatest collections of "coffee-house paintings" in the country—commissioned paintings by folk artists as coffee-house, story-telling murals. The vast majority of her works and her collections of folk art were confiscated, sold or destroyed.

Exhibitions
Farmanfarmaian's work has been publicly exhibited in museums, including: Boston's Museum of Fine Arts, Victoria & Albert Museum, London (2006 & 2009), Niyavaran Cultural Centre, Tehran (2007), Leighton House Museum (2008),Beirut Exhibition Centre (2011), Museum of Modern Art (MoMA), Solomon R. Guggenheim Museum, Grand Rapids Art Museum, Haus der Kunst, Irish Museum of Modern Art (IMMA), Zentrum Paul Klee, Savannah College of Art and Design Museum and more. Her work has been shown in private galleries including, Rose Issa Projects, London; The Third Line, Dubai; New York; Grey Art Gallery, New York University; Galerie Denise Rene, Paris and New York; Lower Belvedere, Vienna; and Ota Fine Art, Tokyo.

Farmanfarmaian participated in the 29th Bienal de São Paulo (2010); the 6th Asia Pacific Triennial of Contemporary Art, Brisbane (2009); and the Venice Biennale (1958, 1966 and 2009). In 1958 she received the Venice Biennale, Iranian Pavilion (gold medal).

Suzanne Cotter curated Farmanfarmaian's work for her first large museum retrospective titled 'Infinite Possibility: Mirror Works and Drawings''' which was on display at the Serralves Museum (also known as Fundação de Serralves) in Porto, Portugal (2014-2015), and then the exhibition travelled to the Solomon R. Guggenheim Museum in New York City (2015). This was her first large US museum exhibition.

 Commissioned installations 
Major commissioned installations include work for the Queensland Art Gallery (2009), the Victoria and Albert Museum (2006), the Dag Hammerskjold building, New York (1981) and the Niyavaran Cultural Center (1977–78), as well as acquisitions by the Metropolitan Museum of Art, The Tehran Museum of Contemporary Art, and the Museum of Contemporary Art Tokyo.

 Collections 
Farmanfarmaian's work is included in multiple public art collections worldwide, including: Victoria & Albert Museum;  The British Museum;  the Metropolitan Museum of Art, Museum of Contemporary Art Chicago, Museum of Fine Arts, Houston, Tate Modern, Queensland Art Gallery, and others. In December 2017, the Monir Museum opened in Negarestan Park Gardens in Tehran, Iran, and is dedicated to showcasing Farmanfarmaian's works. With a collection of 51 works donated by the artist, the Monir Museum collection is managed by the University of Tehran.

In popular culture
Farmanfarmaian was named as one of the BBC's "100 Women" of 2015.

 Bibliography 
The first monograph on Monir Shahroudy Farmanfarmaian, Mirror Mosaics, was edited by Rose Issa, and published by Nazar, Tehran 2006; Heartaches, edited by Rose Issa, Nazar publishing, Tehran (2007). Farmanfarmaian's memoir is titled A Mirror Garden: A Memoir was co-authored by Zara Houshmand (Knopf, 2007). ;; Her work is documented in Iranian Contemporary Art, Barbican  Art Centre, Booth Clibborn, 2001;  Zendegi, 11 Iranian Contemporary Artists, Beirut Exhibition Centre, 2011 the book, Monir Shahroudy Farmanfarmaian: Cosmic Geometry (Damiani Editore & The Third Line, 2011), which features in-depth interview by Hans Ulrich Obrist, and critical essays by Nader Ardalan, Media Farzin and Eleanor Sims, tributes by Farmanfarmaian's friends Etel Adnan, Siah Armajani, caraballo-farman, Golnaz Fathi, Hadi Hazavei, Susan Hefuna, Aziz Isham, Rose Issa, Faryar Javaherian, Abbas Kiarostami, Shirin Neshat, Donna Stein and Frank Stella. She is referenced in an excerpt from The Sense of Unity: The Sufi Tradition in Persian Architecture by Nader Ardalan and Laleh Bakhtiar (1973), and an annotated timeline of Farmanfarmaian's life by Negar Azimi. Women in Abstraction, Centre Pompidou, (2021).

 Film 
The film Monir'' (2014) directed by Bahman Kiarostami, is a documentary about Farmanfarmaian's life and work.

References

External links 
 ArtForum magazine interview with Monir Shahroudy Farmanfarmaian
 Monir Shahroudy Farmanfarmaian Interview from 2010 with ArtAsiaPacific at the Metropolitan Museum of Art
 
 Mohammed Afkhami, Sussan Babaie, Venetia Porter, Natasha Morris. "Honar: The Afkhami Collection of Modern and Contemporary Iranian Art." Phaidon Press, 2017. .

1922 births
2019 deaths
20th-century Iranian women artists
21st-century Iranian women artists
20th-century art collectors
21st-century art collectors
People from Qazvin
Iranian contemporary artists
Iranian emigrants to the United States
Iranian women painters
Parsons School of Design alumni
University of Tehran alumni
Cornell University alumni
Mosaic artists
Mathematical artists
BBC 100 Women
Iranian art collectors
Farmanfarmaian family